is a private junior college in the city of Kōnan in Aichi Prefecture, Japan. Originally established in 1970 as a women's junior college, the school became coeducational in 1998. It will be closed in 2023 because of the decrease in the number of children.

References

External links
 Official website 

Educational institutions established in 1970
Private universities and colleges in Japan
Universities and colleges in Aichi Prefecture
Japanese junior colleges
1970 establishments in Japan